The Speakeasy Club, also known as The Speak,  was a club situated at 48 Margaret Street, London, England, and served as a late-night meeting place for the music industry from 1966 to June 1978. The club took its name and theme from the speakeasies of the American Prohibition era. The club was owned by Iraqi-born entrepreneur David Shamoon,  along with Blaises and The Revolution Club.

History
On 15 December 1966, when the Speakeasy was re-launched after a fire in early 1966, it was managed by Roy Flynn and later Tony Howard became manager when Flynn moved on, having previously been the main artist booker for The Bryan Morrison Agency and NEMS. The initial house D.J was Mike Vesty who had worked for Blaises. Later Laurie O'Leary, a lifelong friend of the Kray twins and former manager of the Sybillas nightclub in Mayfair, London, became the promoter and publicity manager for the club. Throughout the life of the club Jim Carter-Fea worked on the day to night management and was also associated with the other two Shamoon London clubs.

Clientele
The Speakeasy was frequented by record industry and artist agency executives. It also attracted bands who played for low fees in the hope of being spotted and form the basis of the then emerging British rock scene. The club also attracted international touring bands and established artists.

Musicians
Musicians and bands who played at the club (often after recording sessions) include Elton John, Cockney Rebel, The Rolling Stones, The Crazy World Of Arthur Brown, Pink Floyd (who first appeared on 19 September 1967), Arthur Lee and Love, King Crimson, The Marmalade, The Mothers of Invention (October 1967), Yes, Jimi Hendrix (1966), David Bowie, Deep Purple (10 July 1969), The Velvet Underground (6 October 1971, Loaded Tour), Bob Marley (May 1973 Catch a Fire Tour), Jeff Beck, Reg Isidore, Ginger Baker, Jan Hammer, The Gass and Bobby Tench.

Legacy
The Who refer to the club in their album The Who Sell Out ("Speakeasy, drink easy, pull easy") (1967), referencing the club in the "Radio London/Speakeasy/Rotosound Strings" commercial insert for the same album. Elvis Costello mentioned the club in his song "London's Brilliant Parade", included on the album Brutal Youth (1994). The Beatles also threw a party for The Monkees during their 1967 visit to England, which later became the basis for the song "Randy Scouse Git".

Notes

External links
 Speakeasy Club remembered
 Deep Purple A to Z
 Picture of 48 Margaret Street

1966 establishments in England
1978 disestablishments in England
Music venues completed in 1966
Rock music venues
Former music venues in London
Former buildings and structures in the City of Westminster